Sverre Fredriksen (18 February 1906 – 8 January 1961) was a Norwegian footballer. He played in one match for the Norway national football team in 1929.

References

External links
 

1906 births
1981 deaths
Norwegian footballers
Norway international footballers
People from Horten
Association football forwards
FK Ørn-Horten players